Tatiana Anatolyevna Tarasova (born 13 February 1947) is a Russian figure skating coach and national figure skating team adviser. Tarasova has been coach to more world and Olympic champions than any other coach in skating history. Her students have won a total of eight Olympic gold medals in three of the four Olympic figure skating disciplines, in addition to 41 gold medals at the European and World championships. Many of the girls she trained ended up leaving skating at a young age because they suffered from anorexia, other mental health problems, and/or physical overuse injuries.

Personal life 
Tatiana Tarasova is the daughter of Anatoly Tarasov, a famed ice hockey coach, who introduced her to figure skating at the age of five. She lived for more than a decade in Simsbury, Connecticut before moving back to Russia in 2006. She is the widow of Vladimir Krainev, who died in April 2011.

Competitive career 
Tarasova competed in pair skating with Aleksandr Tikhomirov and Georgi Proskurin. With Proskurin, she was a two-time Soviet national medalist. They finished 7th at the 1965 World Championships and 4th at the 1966 European Championships. At 18 years of age, Tarasova sustained a career-ending injury.

Results

with Proskurin

Later career 
Tarasova started coaching at age 19, at her father's insistence. Her most notable students have been Alexei Yagudin, Ilia Kulik, Natalia Bestemianova / Andrei Bukin, Oksana Grishuk / Evgeni Platov, Ekaterina Gordeeva / Sergei Grinkov, Marina Klimova / Sergey Ponomarenko, and Irina Rodnina / Alexander Zaitsev.

In the mid-1980s, Tarasova launched the Russian All-Stars, an ice ballet. She coached for ten years at Simsbury, Connecticut's International Skating Center before announcing her retirement from full-time coaching and moving back to Russia in 2006.

Her students have included:  
Mao Asada. She coached Asada from 2008 until 2010. Asada won the 2010 World title and 2010 Olympic silver medal under Tarasova. Tarasova continued to choreograph for her.
Shizuka Arakawa. Led her to win the World Championships in 2004 and Olympic gold medal in 2006 together with Nikolai Morozov.
Maxim Kovtun. Coached and choreographed his programs starting 2012.
Natalia Bestemianova / Andrei Bukin. Led them to four World Championships and the Olympic gold medal in 1988.
Artem Borodulin. Coached him and choreographed programs for him.
Shae-Lynn Bourne / Victor Kraatz. Coached 2000-2002 with Nikolai Morozov
Galit Chait / Sergei Sakhnovski. Coached 1999-2001 with Nikolai Morozov.
Sasha Cohen. Coached her from 2002 until 2004. Was also her choreographer.
Annette Dytrt. Choreographed programs for her.
Barbara Fusar-Poli / Maurizio Margaglio. Coached 1997-2002.
Elene Gedevanishvili. Has worked with her during multiple periods of her career.
Timothy Goebel. Choreographed multiple programs for him.
Oksana Grishuk / Evgeni Platov. Led them to win 1997 World Championship and an Olympic gold medal in 1998.
Ekaterina Gordeeva / Sergei Grinkov. Coached in first professional time period 1990-1992.
Brian Joubert: choreographed his programs in the 2004-5 season. 
Marina Klimova / Sergey Ponomarenko. Led them to 1992 World Championships and the Olympic gold medal.
Ilia Kulik. Was also his choreographer. Led him to win the Olympic gold medal in 1998.
Michelle Kwan. Choreographed a program.
Evan Lysacek. Choreographed multiple programs for him.
 Kevin Reynolds. Choreographed some of his programs.
Irina Rodnina / Alexander Zaitsev. Led them to win four World Championships 1975-1978 and two Olympic gold medals in 1976 and 1980.
Adelina Sotnikova. Choreographed her programs.
Denis Ten. Worked with him during periods of his career as well as choreographed programs for him.
Sergei Voronov. Choreographed programs for him.
Johnny Weir. Choreographed multiple programs for him.
Alexei Yagudin. Coached and choreographed him from 1998 to his retirement in 2003. Led him to three World Championships and an Olympic gold medal in 2002.

Tarasova is assisted by choreographer Jeanetta Folle.

Views
In March 2023, Tarasova lashed out at Canadian athletes who signed a petition calling for a continuation of the ban on Russian athletes amidst the Russo-Ukrainian War:

Honours and awards
Tarasova was awarded Order of Friendship of Peoples (1984). In March 2008, she was inducted into the World Figure Skating Hall of Fame.

 Order of Merit for the Fatherland, 3rd class (27 February 1998) - for outstanding athletic achievement at the XVIII Olympic Winter Games in 1998
 Order of Honour (13 February 2007) - for outstanding contribution to the development of physical culture and sport and many years of fruitful activity
 Order of the Red Banner of Labour, twice
 Order of the Badge of Honour (1976)
 Order of Friendship of Peoples (1984)
 Honoured coach of the USSR (1975)
 Honoured coach of the RSFSR (1972)
 Honoured Artist of the RSFSR
 Master of Sports of international class

References

External links

Tatiana Tarasova's official site
Vladimir Karinev's official site

Russian figure skating coaches
Soviet figure skating coaches
Russian female pair skaters
Soviet female pair skaters
1947 births
Living people
Figure skating choreographers
Recipients of the Order "For Merit to the Fatherland", 3rd class
Recipients of the Order of Friendship of Peoples
Honored Artists of the RSFSR
Merited Coaches of the Soviet Union
Female sports coaches
Universiade medalists in figure skating
Figure skating commentators
Universiade gold medalists for the Soviet Union
Competitors at the 1966 Winter Universiade
Figure skaters from Moscow